Haskell Consolidated Independent School District is a public school district based in Haskell, Texas (USA).

In addition to Haskell, the district also serves the towns of Rochester and Weinert. Most of Haskell Consolidated ISD is located in Haskell County, although a very small portion of northeastern Stonewall County lies within the district.

In 2009, the school district was rated "recognized" by the Texas Education Agency.

History

On July 1, 1990, Weinert Independent School District merged into Haskell ISD. The district absorbed Rochester County Line Independent School District on June 1, 2005. RISD residents attended HCISD schools starting in August 2005, and the former Rochester campus became HCISD's junior high school.

Schools
Haskell High School (Grades 9-12)
Haskell Junior High School (Grades 6-8)
Haskell Elementary School (Grades PK-5)

References

External links
Haskell Consolidated ISD

School districts in Haskell County, Texas
School districts in Stonewall County, Texas
School districts established in 1990
1990 establishments in Texas